The Netherlands Football League Championship 1935–1936 was contested by 50 teams participating in five divisions. The national champion would be determined by a play-off featuring the winners of the eastern, northern, southern and two western football divisions of the Netherlands. Feijenoord won this year's championship by beating AFC Ajax, SC Enschede, Be Quick 1887 and NAC.

New entrants
Eerste Klasse East:
Promoted from 2nd Division: VV SCH
Eerste Klasse North:
Promoted from 2nd Division: VV Hoogezand
Eerste Klasse South:
Promoted from 2nd Division: RFC Roermond
Eerste Klasse West-I:
Moving in from West-II: HFC Haarlem, HBS Craeyenhout, Hermes DVS, KFC and Sparta Rotterdam
Eerste Klasse West-II:
Moving in from West-I: DHC Delft, Feijenoord, Koninklijke HFC and VUC
Promoted from 2nd Division: Blauw-Wit Amsterdam

Divisions

Eerste Klasse East

Eerste Klasse North

Eerste Klasse South

Eerste Klasse West-I

Eerste Klasse West-II

Championship play-off

References
RSSSF Netherlands Football League Championships 1898-1954
RSSSF Eerste Klasse Oost
RSSSF Eerste Klasse Noord
RSSSF Eerste Klasse Zuid
RSSSF Eerste Klasse West

Netherlands Football League Championship seasons
Neth
Neth